Cariocas, as the people who are born in Rio de Janeiro are called in Brazil, have made extensive contributions to Brazil's (and the world's) history, culture, music, literature, education, science and technology, particularly when Rio de Janeiro was the federal capital and a great hub of Brazilian growth and innovation in all these areas. Some famous cariocas, who were born in Rio, are:

 Adolfo Lutz, physician and scientist
 Andrew  Parsons, journalist
 Allan Góes, mixed martial artist
 Fernando Collor, politician
 Ana Paula Araújo, journalist
 Bernardo Rocha de Rezende, former volleyball player and coach
 Bernardino Machado, twice President of Portugal
 Bruno Barreto, film director
 Carlos Alberto Parreira, football coach
 Carlos Alberto Torres, footballer
 Carlos Chagas Filho, physician and scientist
 Carlos Lacerda, politician, governor of Rio
 Carolina Solberg, beach volleyball player
 Cartola, composer and singer
 Cazuza, composer, poet and singer
 Carlos Machado, jiu-jitsu fighter
 César Maia, politician, mayor of Rio de Janeiro
 Eloisa Biasotto Mano (1924–2019), chemist, professor
 Chico Buarque, composer, singer and writer
 Cildo Meireles, visual artist
 Daniele Suzuki, TV host
 Diogo Portela, darts player
 Douglas Donato Pereira drug lord
 Djan Madruga, swimmer, Olympic medalist
 Dona Ivone Lara, singer and composer
 Edgard Cognat, painter and sculptor
 Eduardo Paes, politician and current mayor of Rio de Janeiro
 Eduardo Riedel, Brazilian politician, 12th Governor of Mato Grosso do Sul
 Eduardo Viveiros de Castro, anthropologist
 Eumir Deodato, Grammy Award-winning musician
 Fabrizio Moretti, drummer of the American band The Strokes
 Fernanda Montenegro, actress, Oscar nominee
 Fernando Henrique Cardoso, sociologist, twice president of Brazil
 Glória Pires, actress
 Heitor Villa-Lobos, classical composer and conductor
 Hélio Oiticica, visual artist
 Isabel, Princess Imperial of Brazil
 Ivan Lins, Latin Grammy Award-winning musician, composer and singer
 Jackie Silva, beach volleyball player, Olympic champion
 Jairzinho, footballer, World Cup champion
 Joao Havelange, president of FIFA 1974–1998
 João Henrique Ulrich Júnior (1850-1895), vice-consul of Brazil
 Joaquim Pedro de Andrade, film director
 Jorge Ben Jor, singer and composer
Jorge José Emiliano dos Santos, football referee
 Jorge Santiago, MMA fighter
 José Guilherme Merquior, diplomat, writer and literary critic
 José Padilha, film director
 Abraham Palatnik (born 1928), artist and inventor
 Waldemar Levy Cardoso, Brazilian field marshal
 Walter Salles, film director
 Leandra Leal, actress
 Leny Andrade, singer
 Luiz Bonfá, composer 
 Luizinho, footballer
 Machado de Assis, writer
 Marco Ruas, mixed martial artist
 Marco Castillo, jazz musician
 Marcos Valle, musician
 Marcos Vinicius Paineiros Santos Souza, footballer
 Maria II, Queen of Portugal
 Marisa Monte, singer and composer
 Marcelo Costa de Andrade, serial killer 
 Morena Baccarin, actress
 Murilo Bustamante, mixed martial artist
 Mussum, actor
 Nelson Piquet, Formula One driver
 Noel Rosa, composer and singer
 Orlando Drummond, actor and dubbing film maker
 Oscar Niemeyer, architect
 Paulo Coelho, writer
 Pedro II, Emperor of Brazil
 Pixinguinha, one of the fathers of Chorinho music
 Philippe Coutinho, footballer
 Renata Vasconcellos, journalist
 Renato Russo, composer, poet and singer, leader of the band Legião Urbana
 Ricardo Arona, MMA fighter
 Roberta Marquez, ballet dancer
 Roberto Marinho, President and founder of Organizações Globo; businessman person
 Robson da Silva, sprinter, Olympic medalist
 Roger Gracie, jiu-jitsu/MMA fighter
 Royce Gracie, jiu-jitsu/MMA fighter
 Romário, footballer
 Ronaldo, footballer
 Rosa Magalhães, carnival producer
 Sandra Pires, beach volleyball player, Olympic champion
 Sebastian of Bourbon and Braganza, Infante of Portugal and Spain
 Sérgio Vieira de Mello, diplomat
 Silvio Santos, owner of the SBT television station
 Giulliana Succine, actress and psychologist
 Taís Araújo, actress
 Thiago Silva, footballer
 Tom Jobim, composer and musician, one of the creators of Bossa Nova
 Vinícius de Moraes, writer, poet, musician and diplomat
 Vitor Belfort, jiu-jitsu/MMA fighter
 Viviane Araújo, model and actress
 Washington de Mesquista Ferreira, footballer
 Zico, footballer
 Suellen Labrujo, champion ice skater

 
Rio de Janeiro